The 1991 Romania rugby union tour of New Zealand was a series of matches played between May and June 1991 in New Zealand by Romania national rugby union team to prepare the 1991 Rugby World Cup.

Results 
Scores and results list Romania's points tally first.

References

 

1991 rugby union tours
1991
1991
1991 in New Zealand rugby union
1991 in Romanian sport
1990–91 in European rugby union